On the Road is the eighth album released by American comedian George Carlin. It was recorded on October 3, 1976 at the Dorothy Chandler Pavilion in Los Angeles, California, and released in April 1977. The album was also included as part of the 1999 The Little David Years (1971-1977) box set.

The original LP included a "libretto" - a word-for-word transcript of the album.

On the Road would be Carlin's last album for three years because he suffered a heart attack in 1978 and took some time off afterwards before he would release A Place for My Stuff in 1981.

A warning label that says "R: Recommended Adult Listening" appears on the cover of the album. This was an early example of warning people that albums contain questionable content before the Parental Advisory label was invented.

Track listing

In "How's Your Dog?", Carlin makes reference to a dog named "Tippy". Tippy was a female dog he had as a pet, referenced in several other of his skits throughout the years.

References

1977 albums
George Carlin live albums
Stand-up comedy albums
Spoken word albums by American artists
Live spoken word albums
1970s comedy albums
Little David Records live albums
Atlantic Records live albums